Stranded is a 1927 American silent romance film, directed by Phil Rosen. It stars Shirley Mason, William Collier Jr., and John Miljan, and was released on August 15, 1927.

Cast list
Shirley Mason as Sally Simpson
William Collier Jr. as Johnny Nash
John Miljan as Grant Payne
Florence Turner as Mrs. Simpson
Gale Henry as Lucille Lareaux
Shannon Day as Betty
Lucy Beaumont as Grandmother
Rosa Gore as Landlady

Preservation status
This film survives in the Library of Congress collection.

References

External links 
 
 
 

American silent feature films
American romance films
1920s romance films
Films directed by Phil Rosen
American black-and-white films
1920s American films